John Chadworth (or Chedworth; died 1471) was Provost of King's College, Cambridge from 1447 until his election as Bishop of Lincoln. He was elected bishop about 11 February 1451 and consecrated on 18 June 1452. He died on 23 November 1471.

Citations

References

 

Bishops of Lincoln
1471 deaths
Year of birth unknown
15th-century English Roman Catholic bishops
Provosts of King's College, Cambridge